Me, Myself & I is the seventh studio album by American rapper Fat Joe. The album was released on November 14, 2006, by Terror Squad, Virgin and Imperial. The album was supported by the single "Make It Rain" featuring Lil Wayne, which peaked at number 13 on the US Billboard Hot 100 chart.

The received generally positive reviews. The album debuted at number 14 on the US Billboard 200 chart, selling 60,000 copies in its first week.

Critical reception 

Me, Myself & I received mixed reviews from music critics who found it to be of less quality compared to All or Nothing. AllMusic's David Jeffries praised the album for toning down on featured artists to focus more on Joe's deep street lyricism backed by ear-grabbing production, concluding that "hearing this high-profile thug so boldly reclaiming his street cred without any concessions is exciting and makes it easy to shrug off this driven full-length's one-track mind." Soren Baker of the Los Angeles Times praised the album for balancing out the street bangers with contemplative tracks like "Bendicion Mami" and "Story to Tell", saying that it makes "Joe's latest a well-rounded affair." Andrew Kameka of HipHopDX found some of the lyrical content wearing thin but praised Joe for sticking with his gut of performing gruff street tracks with aggressive production, saying that "Fat Joe doesn't hold his weight on a few of the album's songs, but he delivers enough strength to silence anyone who questions his place in Hip Hop.

Steve 'Flash' Juon of RapReviews found the lyrical content to be samey because of Joe's lack of energy and that they were more suited for Rick Ross and Pitbull, concluding with, "That personality is completely absent from Me, Myself & I, which may make this the most ironically titled album of his career." Jody Rosen of Entertainment Weekly said that despite two Lil Wayne collaborations, the album suffers from generic brag raps and southern production that are more slave to trends than imaginative, concluding with, "If only Joe’s CD had less of he, himself, and him." Evan McGarvey of Stylus Magazine criticized the album for showcasing Joe's worst tendencies of borrowing regional hip hop beats and delivering sex and street lyrics that sound more humorous, concluding with "Don’t buy it. He’ll be back next year saying the same thing, synth-de-jour in tow."

Commercial performance
Me, Myself & I debuted at number 14 on the US Billboard 200 chart, selling 60,000 copies in its first week. The album also debuted at number three on the US Top R&B/Hip-Hop Albums chart, becoming Joe's fifth top-ten album on the chart. As of September 2007, the album has sold a total of 206,000 copies in the United States.

Track listing

Charts

Weekly charts

Year-end charts

References 

2006 albums
Fat Joe albums
Albums produced by Scott Storch
Albums produced by the Runners
Albums produced by DJ Khaled